Abyss of Longing Throats is the eighth studio album by Gnaw Their Tongues, released on August 7, 2015 by Crucial Blast.

Track listing

Personnel
Adapted from the Abyss of Longing Throats liner notes.
 Maurice de Jong (as Mories) – vocals, effects, recording, cover art

Release history

References

External links 
 
 Abyss of Longing Throats at Bandcamp

2015 albums
Gnaw Their Tongues albums